Turbonilla candida is a species of sea snail, a marine gastropod mollusk in the family Pyramidellidae, the pyrams and their allies.

Distribution
This marine species occurs off South Africa.

References

External links
 To Biodiversity Heritage Library (4 publications)
 To Encyclopedia of Life
 To World Register of Marine Species

candida
Gastropods described in 1855